The women's heptathlon event at the 2009 Summer Universiade was held on 10–11 July.

Medalists

Results

100 metres hurdles
Wind:Heat 1: +0.2 m/s, Heat 2: -1.3 m/s

High jump

Shot put

200 metres
Wind:Heat 1: +1.1 m/s, Heat 2: +0.8 m/s

Long jump

Javelin throw

800 metres

Final standings

References
Results (archived)

Heptathlon
2009 in women's athletics
2009